The Ethiopian Shipping and Logistics Services Enterprise (ESLSE), known commercially as the Ethiopian Shipping Lines, is the national cargo shipping company of Ethiopia. Established in 1964, it has continued to operate despite Ethiopia having become a landlocked country in 1993; its main base is now the Port of Djibouti and Berbera in Somaliland.

History
Ethiopia regained a coastline on the Red Sea when Eritrea was federated with Ethiopia in 1952. However, it was not until 1965 that the Ethiopian Shipping Lines was established as a joint venture with the American company Towers Perrin. A Dutch company was contracted to manage the line along the lines of the then-ongoing arrangement with TWA to manage the flag carrier airline Ethiopian Airlines.

Operations commenced in 1966 with three ships called Queen of Sheba, Lion of Judah and Lalibela. The Line quickly faced serious challenges when the Suez Canal was closed in 1967. Until Suez Canal was opened again, the vessels had to go all around the Cape. The size of the ships was not appropriate for such long voyages, and the company ran into a loss. Since then, the ESL has focused mainly on domestic import and export, to promote foreign trade. It has generally been profitable.

See also
List of largest container shipping companies
Messina Line
Ocean Network Express

References

Transport companies of Ethiopia
Container shipping companies
Companies based in Addis Ababa
Transport companies established in 1965